The National People's Congress Education, Science, Culture and Public Health Committee is one of nine special committees of the National People's Congress, the national legislature of the People's Republic of China. The special committee was created during the first session of the 6th National People's Congress in June 1983, and has existed for every National People's Congress since.

Chairpersons

References

Education, Science, Culture and Public Health Committee
Parliamentary committees on Healthcare